The 2018 Quebec general election was held on October 1, 2018, to elect members to the National Assembly of Quebec.  The election saw a landslide victory for the Coalition Avenir Québec (CAQ) led by François Legault, which won 74 of 125 seats, giving the party a majority and unseating the Quebec Liberal Party. The Liberals became the Official Opposition with 31 seats.

This election was the first won by the CAQ, which had previously been the third party in the legislature. It was also the first since 1966 that had been won by a party other than the Liberals or Parti Québécois.

Background
In Quebec the Liberal Party had held power since 2003, save for a period of less than two years between 2012 and 2014.

The National Assembly has had a fixed four-year term since passing a fixed election date law in 2013. The law stipulates that "the general election following the end of a Legislature shall be held on the first Monday of October of the fourth calendar year following the year that includes the last day of the previous Legislature", setting the date for October 1, 2018. However, the Chief Electoral Officer could have changed the election date in the event of a natural disaster. Furthermore, the Lieutenant Governor could have called an election sooner should the Premier have requested one, or in the event the government had been dissolved by a motion of no confidence.

Timeline

Party standings

|- style="background:#ccc;"
! rowspan="2" colspan="2" style="text-align:left;"|Party
! rowspan="2" style="text-align:left;"|Party leader
! colspan="2" style="text-align:center;"|Seats
|- style="background:#ccc; text-align:center;"
||2014
|style="font-size:80%;"|Dissolution

|align=left|Philippe Couillard
|70 ||68

|align=left|Jean-François Lisée
|30 ||28

|align=left|François Legault
|22 ||21

|align=left|Manon Massé
|3 ||3

| style="text-align:left;" colspan="2"|
|0 ||5

| style="text-align:left;" colspan="3"|Vacant
|0
|-
| style="text-align:left;" colspan="3"|Total
!125 !!125
|}

Seat changes (2014–2017)

Other developments

Incumbents not running for reelection
As of September 5, 2018, a total of 45 MNAs elected in 2014 will not run in the 2018 election, of whom 12 resigned from the National Assembly, one died in office and 32 announced that they will not seek re-election including one whose riding was dissolved, and one who got fired. The latter comprise the following:

At the end of his term, Gendron, Dean of the National Assembly, will have served for 41 years and 10 months, representing Abitibi-Ouest for 11 terms.

Campaign

Slogans

Issues
The election was believed to be the first in almost half a century that had not been fought on the issue of whether Quebec should stay in Canada. The PQ had promised not to hold another referendum on sovereignty until 2022 at the earliest had it won.

Opinion polls
The CAQ’s landslide victory was, in part, surprising due to the close outcome that was projected by opinion polls during the campaigning period. Although polls estimated a difference of approximately 2% between the PLQ and the CAQ in the days leading up to the election, the results showed a 12.6% gap in voting.

Studies suggest that this outcome is the result of an ongoing reconfiguration in Quebec’s electoral system that is shifting from a two-party to a multi-party system, as the vote share for the QLP and the PQ had been on the decline since 2007. Additionally, the question of sovereignty, which had previously been a reliable indicator of voting choice was replaced by other matters such as identity, immigration, redistribution, and the environment. Research indicates that the polls may have been misled by this change in focus combined with last-minute moves toward the CAQ and the tendency of those who did not disclose their vote to disproportionately vote for the same party. The topic of identity appeared extremely important and was mobilized throughout individuals’ participation with the election campaigns. These findings suggest that the CAQ’s shocking victory was the result of longstanding trends toward a multi-party system and a diversified agenda of topics which were not accurately predicted by the polls.

Candidates
 This table lists the names of the registered candidates as they appear on the official list published by the Chief Electoral Officer. The symbol ‡ indicates incumbent members not running for re-election.
 Abbreviations used in the table: Auto.: Équipe autonomiste. BP: Bloc pot. CAP: Citoyens au pouvoir du Québec. CAQ: Coalition avenir Québec - L'équipe François Legault. CINQ: Changement intégrité pour notre Québec. Conservative or Cons.: Conservative Party of Québec. Cul.: Parti culinaire du Québec. Green: Green Party of Québec. Ind.: Independent candidate. Liberal: Quebec Liberal Party. Marxist–Leninist or ML: Parti marxiste-léniniste du Québec. NDP: Nouveau Parti démocratique du Québec. Nul: Parti nul. PL: Parti libre. PQ: Parti québécois. Prov.: Alliance provinciale du Québec. P51: Parti 51. QS: Québec solidaire. VP: Voie du peuple.
 In this list, electoral districts are grouped by administrative region and regions are listed in the order of their administrative number. (However, some sections of the list group two regions that comprise a small number of districts.) Maps of the regions and the districts they include can be consulted at Élections Quebec.

Bas-Saint-Laurent and Gaspésie–Îles-de-la-Madeleine

|-
| style="background:whitesmoke;"|Bonaventure
|
|François Whittom
||
|Sylvain Roy
|
|Hélène Desaulniers
|
|Catherine Cyr Wright
|
|Daniel Bouchard (CAP)Guy Gallant (Ind.)Heather Imhoff (Green)
||
|Sylvain Roy
|-
| style="background:whitesmoke;"|Côte-du-Sud
|
|Simon Laboissonnière
|
|Michel Forget
||
|Marie-Eve Proulx
|
|Guillaume Dufour
|
|Renaud Blais (Nul)Gabriel Dubé (BP)Marc Roussin (Cons.)
||
|Norbert Morin ‡
|-
| style="background:whitesmoke;"|Gaspé
|
|Alexandre Boulay
||
|Méganne Perry-Mélançon
|
|Louis LeBouthillier
|
|Alexis Dumont-Blanchet
|
|
||
|Gaétan Lelièvre ‡
|-
| style="background:whitesmoke;"|Îles-de-la-Madeleine
|
|Maryse Lapierre
||
|Joël Arseneau
|
|Yves Renaud
|
|Robert Boudreau-Welsh
|
|
||
|Germain Chevarie ‡
|-
| style="background:whitesmoke;"|Matane-Matapédia
|
|Annie Fournier
||
|Pascal Bérubé
|
|Mathieu Quenum
|
|Marie-Phare Boucher
|
|Pierre-Luc Coulombe (Green)Jocelyn Rioux (CAP)Paul-Émile Vignola (Cons.)
||
|Pascal Bérubé
|-
| style="background:whitesmoke;"|Rimouski
|
|Claude Laroche
||
|Harold LeBel
|
|Nancy Levesque
|
|Carol-Ann Kack
|
|Denis Bélanger (Ind.)Dany Levesque (BP)Alexie Plourde (Green)
||
|Harold LeBel
|-
| style="background:whitesmoke;"|Rivière-du-Loup–Témiscouata
|
|Jean D'Amour
|
|Vincent Couture
||
|Denis Tardif
|
|Goulimine Sylvie Cadôret
|
|Martin Perron (Cons.)
||
|Jean D'Amour
|}

Saguenay–Lac-Saint-Jean, Côte-Nord and Nord-du-Québec

|-
| style="background:whitesmoke;"|Chicoutimi
|
|Marie-Josée Morency
|
|Mireille Jean
||
|Andrée Laforest
|
|Pierre Dostie
|
|Leonard Gagnon
|
|Tommy Philippe (Green)
||
|Mireille Jean
|-
| style="background:whitesmoke;"|Dubuc
|
|Serge Simard
|
|Marie-Annick Fortin
||
|François Tremblay
|
|Marie Francine Bienvenue
|
|François Pelletier
|
|Line Bélanger (Nul)
||
|Serge Simard
|-
| style="background:whitesmoke;"|Duplessis
|
|Laurence Méthot
||
|Lorraine Richard
|
|Line Cloutier
|
|Martine Roux
|
|Alexandre Leblanc
|
|
||
|Lorraine Richard
|-
| style="background:whitesmoke;"|Jonquière
|
|Alexandre Duguay
||
|Sylvain Gaudreault
|
|Benoit Rochefort
|
|Marcel Lapointe
|
|Jimmy Voyer
|
|Julie Sion (Green)
||
|Sylvain Gaudreault
|-
| style="background:whitesmoke;"|Lac-Saint-Jean
|
|Mathieu Huot
|
|William Fradette
||
|Éric Girard
|
|Manon Girard
|
|Michael Grecoff
|
|Maude Gouin Huot (Auto.)
||
|Alexandre Cloutier ‡
|-
| style="background:whitesmoke;"|René-Lévesque
|
|Jonathan Lapointe
||
|Martin Ouellet
|
|André Desrosiers
|
|Sandrine Bourque
|
|Eric Barnabé
|
|
||
|Martin Ouellet
|-
| style="background:whitesmoke;"|Roberval
||
|Philippe Couillard
|
|Thomas Gaudreault
|
|Denise Trudel
|
|Luc-Antoine Cauchon
|
|Carl C. Lamontagne
|
|Julie Boucher (CAP)Lynda Lalancette (Nul)
||
|Philippe Couillard
|-
| style="background:whitesmoke;"|Ungava
|
|Jean Boucher
|
|Jonathan Mattson
||
|Denis Lamothe
|
|Alisha Tukkiapik
|
|Alexandre Croteau
|
|Louis R. Couture (NDP)

Cristina Roos (Green)
||
|Jean Boucher
|}

Capitale-Nationale

|-
| style="background:whitesmoke;"|Charlesbourg
|
|François Blais
|
|Annie Morin
||
|Jonatan Julien
|
|Élisabeth Germain
|
|
|
|Valérie Tremblay
|
|
|
|Daniel Pelletier (Auto.)
||
|François Blais
|-
| style="background:whitesmoke;"|Charlevoix–Côte-de-Beaupré
|
|Caroline Simard
|
|Nathalie Leclerc
||
|Émilie Foster
|
|Jessica Crossan
|
|
|
|
|
|Andréanne Bouchard  
|
|Albert Chiasson (CAP)
||
|Caroline Simard
|-
| style="background:whitesmoke;"|Chauveau
|
|Véronyque Tremblay
|
|Jonathan Gagnon
||
|Sylvain Lévesque
|
|Francis Lajoie
|
|Sabir Isufi
|
|Adrien Pouliot
|
|Mona Belleau 
|
|
||
|Véronyque Tremblay
|-
| style="background:whitesmoke;"|Jean-Lesage
|
|Gertrude Bourdon
|
|Claire Vignola
|
|Christiane Gamache
||
|Sol Zanetti
|
|Alex Paradis-Bellefeuille
|
|Anne Deblois
|
|Raymond Côté  
|
|Marie-Pierre Deschênes (CAP)Nicolas Bouffard-Savoie (Auto.)Claude Moreau (ML)Charles Verreault-Lemieux (Nul)
||
|André Drolet ‡
|-
| style="background:whitesmoke;"|Jean-Talon
||
|Sébastien Proulx
|
|Sylvain Barrette
|
|Joëlle Boutin
|
|Patrick Provost
|
|Macarena Diab
|
|Carl Bérubé
|
|Hamid Nadji 
|
|Ginette Boutet (ML)Ali Dahan (Ind.)Stéphane Pouleur (Auto.)
||
|Sébastien Proulx
|-
| style="background:whitesmoke;"|La Peltrie
|
|Stéphane Lacasse
|
|Doni Berberi
||
|Éric Caire
|
|Alexandre Jobin-Lawler
|
|Sandra Mara Riedo
|
|Julie Plamondon
|
|
|
|Kevin Bouchard (Nul)Yohann Dauphinais (CAP)Josée Mélanie Michaud (Auto.)Stephen Wright (P51)
||
|Éric Caire
|-
| style="background:whitesmoke;"|Louis-Hébert
|
|Julie-Maude Perron
|
|Normand Beauregard
||
|Geneviève Guilbault
|
|Guillaume Boivin
|
|Daydree Vendette
|
|Natalie Bjerke
|
|Caroline Côté 
|
|Vincent Bégin (Ind.)Jean-Luc Rouckout (Auto.)
||
|Geneviève Guilbault
|-
| style="background:whitesmoke;"|Montmorency
|
|Marie France Trudel
|
|Alexandre Huot
||
|Jean-François Simard
|
|Marie-Christine Lamontagne
|
|Nicholas Lescarbeau
|
|Daniel Beaulieu
|
|
|
|Jean Bédard (ML)Jean-François Simard (Ind.)
||
|Raymond Bernier ‡
|-
| style="background:whitesmoke;"|Portneuf
|
|Philippe Gasse
|
|Christian Hébert
||
|Vincent Caron
|
|Odile Pelletier
|
|
|
|Guy Morin
|
|
|
|Constance Guimont (CAP)
||
|Michel Matte ‡
|-
| style="background:whitesmoke;"|Taschereau
|
|Florent Tanlet
|
|Diane Lavallée
|
|Svetlana Solomykina
||
|Catherine Dorion
|
|Élisabeth Grégoire
|
|
|
|Roger Duguay
|
|Christian Lavoie (CAP)Guy Boivin (Auto.)Nicolas Pouliot (Nul)
||
|Agnès Maltais ‡
|-
| style="background:whitesmoke;"|Vanier-Les Rivières
|
|Patrick Huot
|
|William Duquette
||
|Mario Asselin
|
|Monique Voisine
|
|Samuel Raymond
|
|Alain Fortin
|
|
|
|Carl Côté (Ind.)David Dallaire (CAP)Carl-André Poliquin (Nul)
||
|Patrick Huot
|}

Mauricie

|-
| style="background:whitesmoke;"|Champlain
|
|Pierre-Michel Auger
|
|Gaëtan Leclerc
||
|Sonia LeBel
|
|Steven Roy Cullen
|
|Stéphanie Dufresne
|
|Pierre-Benoit Fortin
|
|Éric Gauthier (Auto.)Anthony Rouss (BP)
||
|Pierre-Michel Auger
|-
|rowspan="3" style="background:whitesmoke;"|Laviolette–Saint-Maurice
|rowspan=3|
|rowspan=3|Pierre Giguère
|rowspan=3|
|rowspan=3|Jacynthe Bruneau
|rowspan=3 |
|rowspan=3|Marie-Louise Tardif
|rowspan=3|
|rowspan=3|Christine Cardin
|rowspan=3|
|rowspan=3|
|rowspan=3|
|rowspan=3|Ugo Hamel
|rowspan=3|
|rowspan=3|Jacques Gosselin (CAP)
||
|Julie Boulet ‡Laviolette
|-
| colspan="2" style="background:whitesmoke; text-align:center;"|Merged riding
|-
||
|Pierre GiguèreSaint-Maurice
|-
| style="background:whitesmoke;"|Maskinongé
|
|Marc H. Plante
|
|Nicole Morin
||
|Simon Allaire
|
|Simon Piotte
|
|Amélie St-Yves
|
|Maxime Rousseau
|
|Jonathan Beaulieu-Richard (Ind.)Alain Bélanger (CAP)
||
|Marc H. Plante
|-
| style="background:whitesmoke;"|Trois-Rivières
|
|Jean-Denis Girard
|
|Marie-Claude Camirand
||
|Jean Boulet
|
|Valérie Delage
|
|Adis Simidzija
|
|Daniel Hénault
|
|
||
|Jean-Denis Girard
|}

Estrie

|-
| style="background:whitesmoke;"|Mégantic
|
|Robert G. Roy
|
|Gloriane Blais
||
|François Jacques
|
|Andrée Larrivée
|
|Sylvain Dodier
|
|Richard Veilleux
|
|
||
|Ghislain Bolduc ‡
|-
| style="background:whitesmoke;"|Orford
|
|Guy Madore
|
|Maxime Leclerc
||
|Gilles Bélanger
|
|Annabelle Lalumière-Ting
|
|Stéphanie Desmeules
|
|Tommy Poulin
|
|Joseph Tremblay-Bonsens (Cons.)
||
|Pierre Reid ‡
|-
| style="background:whitesmoke;"|Richmond
|
|Annie Godbout
|
|Véronique Vigneault
||
|André Bachand
|
|Colombe Landry
|
|Yves la Madeleine
|
|Déitane Gendron
|
|Karl Brousseau (Cons.)
||
|Karine Vallières ‡
|-
| style="background:whitesmoke;"|Saint-François
|
|Charles Poulin
|
|Solange Masson
||
|Geneviève Hébert
|
|Kévin Côté
|
|Mathieu Morin
|
|Cyrille Mc Elreavy
|
|
||
|Guy Hardy ‡
|-
| style="background:whitesmoke;"|Sherbrooke
|
|Luc Fortin
|
|Guillaume Rousseau
|
|Bruno Vachon
||
|Christine Labrie
|
|Marie-Maud Côté-Rouleau
|
|Éric Lebrasseur
|
|Luc Lainé (Ind.)Mona Louis-Jean (NDP)Sara Richard (Nul)Jossy Roy (BP)Patrick Tétreault (Ind.)
||
|Luc Fortin
|}

Montréal

East

|-
| style="background:whitesmoke;"|Anjou–Louis-Riel
||
|Lise Thériault
|
|Karl Dugal
|
|Michèle Gamelin
|
|Marie-Josée Forget
|
|Hamza Madani
|
|
|
|Vincent Henes  
|
|
||
|Lise Thériault
|-
| style="background:whitesmoke;"|Bourassa-Sauvé
||
|Paule Robitaille
|
|Karine Gauvin
|
|Julie Séide
|
|Alejandra Zaga Mendez
|
|Karina Barros
|
|Michel Boissonneault
|
|Abed Louis
|
|Jean-François Brunet (BP)Sabrinel Laouadi (CINQ)Jean Marie Floriant Ndzana (Ind.)
||
|Rita de Santis ‡
|-
| style="background:whitesmoke;"|Bourget
|
|Vincent Girard
|
|Maka Kotto
||
|Richard Campeau
|
|Marlène Lessard
|
|Marieke Hassell-Crépeau
|
|
|
|
|
|Dany Roy (CAP)Claude Brunelle (ML)
||
|Maka Kotto
|-
| style="background:whitesmoke;"|Gouin
|
|Alessandra Lubrina
|
|Olivier Gignac
|
|Arianne Lebel
||
|Gabriel Nadeau-Dubois
|
|Alice Sécheresse
|
|
|
|
|
|Jenny Cartwright (Nul)Ana da Silva (BP)
||
|Gabriel Nadeau-Dubois
|-
| style="background:whitesmoke;"|Hochelaga-Maisonneuve
|
|Julien Provencher-Proulx
|
|Carole Poirier
|
|Sarah Beaumier
||
|Alexandre Leduc
|
|
|
|Mathieu Beaudoin
|
|Éric-Abel Baland
|
|Gabriel Boily (CAP)Christine Dandenault (ML)Etienne Mallette (BP)
||
|Carole Poirier
|-
| style="background:whitesmoke;"|Jeanne-Mance–Viger
||
|Filomena Rotiroti
|
|Marie-Josée Bruneau
|
|Sarah Petrari
|
|Ismaël Seck
|
|Sylvie Hétu
|
|Sylvain Dallaire
|
|
|
|Garnet Colly (ML)
||
|Filomena Rotiroti
|-
| style="background:whitesmoke;"|LaFontaine
||
|Marc Tanguay
|
|Claude Gauthier
|
|Loredana Bacchi
|
|David Touchette
|
|
|
|Caleb Lavoie
|
|
|
|Yves Le Seigle (ML)
||
|Marc Tanguay
|-
| style="background:whitesmoke;"|Laurier-Dorion
|
|George Tsantrizos
|
|Marie-Aline Vadius
|
|Simon Langelier
||
|Andrés Fontecilla
|
|Juan Vazquez
|
|Mohammad Yousuf
|
|Apostolia Petropoulos
|
|Arezki Malek (ML)Mathieu Marcil (Nul)Eric Lessard (CAP)Hugô St-Onge (BP)Chef Jean Louis Thémis (Cul.)
||
|Gerry Sklavounos ‡
|-
| style="background:whitesmoke;"|Maurice-Richard
||
|Marie Montpetit
|
|Frédéric Lapointe
|
|Manon Gauthier
|
|Raphaël Rebelo
|
|Gilles Fournelle
|
|
|
|Jean Rémillard 
|
|Morgan Ali (BP)Manon Dupuis (Nul)Daniel St-Hilaire (CAP)
||
|Marie Montpetit
|-
| style="background:whitesmoke;"|Mercier
|
|Gabrielle Collu
|
|Michelle Blanc
|
|Johanne Gagné
||
|Ruba Ghazal
|
|Stephanie Rochemont
|
|Ludovic Proulx
|
|Conrad Thompson 
|
|Serge Lachapelle (ML)Malou Marcil (Nul)
||
|Amir Khadir ‡
|-
| style="background:whitesmoke;"|Pointe-aux-Trembles
|
|Eric Ouellette
|
|Jean-Martin Aussant
||
|Chantal Rouleau
|
|Céline Pereira
|
|
|
|
|
|
|
|Louis Chandonnet (Auto.)Geneviève Royer (ML)Pierre Surette (BP)
||
|Nicole Léger ‡
|-
| style="background:whitesmoke;"|Rosemont
|
|Agata La Rosa
|
|Jean-François Lisée
|
|Sonya Cormier
||
|Vincent Marissal
|
|Karl Dubois
|
|Alexandra Liendo
|
|Paulina Ayala 
|
|Stéphane Chénier (ML)Coralie Laperrière (BP)Catherine Raymond-Poirier (Nul)
||
|Jean-François Lisée
|-
| style="background:whitesmoke;"|Sainte-Marie–Saint-Jacques
|
|Louis Charron
|
|Jennifer Drouin
|
|Anna Klisko
||
|Manon Massé
|
|Anna Calderon
|
|Don Ivanski
|
|
|
|Alexis Cossette-Trudel (CAP)Henri Ladouceur (BP)
||
|Manon Massé
|-
| style="background:whitesmoke;"|Viau
||
|Frantz Benjamin
|
|Mounddy Sanon
|
|Janny Gaspard
|
|Sylvain Lafrenière
|
|
|
|Patrick St-Onge
|
|Mamoun Ahmed 
|
|Beverly Bernardo (Ind.)Hugo Pépino (BP)
||
|David Heurtel ‡
|}

West

|-
| style="background:whitesmoke;"|Acadie
||
|Christine St-Pierre
|
|Farida Sam
|
|Sophie Chiasson
|
|Viviane Martinova-Croteau
|
|Laurence Sicotte
|
|Jocelyn Chouinard
|
|Michel Welt
|
|Yvon Breton (ML)
||
|Christine St-Pierre
|-
| style="background:whitesmoke;"|D'Arcy-McGee
||
|David Birnbaum
|
|Eliane Pion
|
|Mélodie Cohn
|
|Jean-Claude Kumuyange
|
|Jérémie Alarco
|
|Yaniv Loran
|
|Leigh Smit
|
|Diane Johnston (ML)
||
|David Birnbaum
|-
| style="background:whitesmoke;"|Jacques-Cartier
||
|Greg Kelley
|
|Martine Bourgeois
|
|Karen Hilchey
|
|Nicolas Chatel-Launay
|
|Catherine Polson
|
|Louis-Charles Fortier
|
|France Séguin
|
|Cynthia Bouchard (CAP)Teodor Daiev (Ind.)
||
|Geoffrey Kelley ‡
|-
| style="background:whitesmoke;"|Marguerite-Bourgeoys
||
|Hélène David
|
|Jeannot Desbiens
|
|Vicky Michaud
|
|Camille St-Laurent
|
|Smail Louardiane
|
|
|
|Nashaat Elsayed
|
|
||
|Robert Poëti ‡
|-
| style="background:whitesmoke;"|Marquette
||
|Enrico Ciccone
|
|Carole Vincent
|
|Marc Hétu
|
|Anick Perreault
|
|Kimberly Salt
|
|Olivia Boye
|
|John Symon
|
|Roger Déry (Ind.)Patrick Desjardins (CAP)
||
|François Ouimet ‡
|-
| rowspan="3" style="background:whitesmoke;"|Mont-Royal–Outremont
|rowspan=3 |
|rowspan=3|Pierre Arcand
|rowspan=3|
|rowspan=3|Caroline Labelle
|rowspan=3|
|rowspan=3|Anne-Marie Gagnon
|rowspan=3|
|rowspan=3|Eve Torres
|rowspan=3|
|rowspan=3|Vincent J. Carbonneau
|rowspan=3|
|rowspan=3|Yaakov Pollak
|rowspan=3|
|rowspan=3|Rebecca Anne Clark
|rowspan=3|
|rowspan=3|Normand Fournier (ML)
||
|Pierre ArcandMont-Royal
|-
| colspan="2" style="background:whitesmoke; text-align:center;"|Merged riding
|-
||
|Hélène DavidOutremont
|-
| style="background:whitesmoke;"|Nelligan
||
|Monsef Derraji
|
|Chantal Legendre
|
|Angela Rapoport
|
|Simon Tremblay-Pepin
|
|Giuseppe Cammarrota
|
|Mathew Levitsky-Kaminski
|
|Leslie Eric Murphy
|
|
||
|Martin Coiteux ‡
|-
| style="background:whitesmoke;"|Notre-Dame-de-Grâce
||
|Kathleen Weil
|
|Lucie Bélanger
|
|Nathalie Dansereau
|
|Kathleen Gudmundsson
|
|Chad Walcott
|
|Souhail Ftouh
|
|David-Roger Gagnon
|
|Rachel Hoffman (ML)Cynthia Nichols (Ind.)
||
|Kathleen Weil
|-
| style="background:whitesmoke;"|Robert-Baldwin
||
|Carlos J. Leitão
|
|Marie-Imalta Pierre-Lys
|
|Laura Azéroual
|
|Zachary Williams
|
|Catherine Richardson
|
|Michael-Louis Coppa
|
|Luca Brown
|
|
||
|Carlos Leitão
|-
| style="background:whitesmoke;"|Saint-Henri–Sainte-Anne
||
|Dominique Anglade
|
|Dieudonné Ella-Oyono
|
|Sylvie Hamel
|
|Benoit Racette
|
|Jean-Pierre Duford
|
|Caroline Orchard
|
|Steven Scott
|
|Félix Gagnon-Paquin (BP)Linda Sullivan (ML)Christopher Young (CINQ)
||
|Dominique Anglade
|-
| style="background:whitesmoke;"|Saint-Laurent
||
|Marwah Rizqy
|
|Elias Dib Nicolas
|
|Marc Baaklini
|
|Marie Josèphe Pigeon
|
|Halimatou Bah
|
|Guy Morissette
|
|Jacques Dago
|
|Fernand Deschamps (ML)
||
|Jean-Marc Fournier ‡
|-
| style="background:whitesmoke;"|Verdun
||
|Isabelle Melançon
|
|Constantin Fortier
|
|Nicole Leduc
|
|Vanessa Roy
|
|Alex Tyrrell
|
|Yedidya-Eitan Moryoussef
|
|Raphaël Fortin
|
|Marc-André Milette (Nul)Hugo Richard (BP)Eileen Studd (ML)
||
|Isabelle Melançon
|-
| style="background:whitesmoke;"|Westmount–Saint-Louis
||
|Jennifer Maccarone
|
|J. Marion Benoit
|
|Michelle Morin
|
|Ekaterina Piskunova
|
|Samuel Dajakran Kuhn
|
|Mikey Colangelo Lauzon
|
|Nicholas Peter Lawson
|
|
||
|Jacques Chagnon ‡
|}

Outaouais and Abitibi-Témiscamingue 

|-
| style="background:whitesmoke;"|Abitibi-Est
|
|Guy Bourgeois
|
|Élizabeth Larouche
||
|Pierre Dufour
|
|Lyne Cyr
|
|Mélina Paquette
|
|
|
|Éric Caron
|
|
||
|Guy Bourgeois
|-
| style="background:whitesmoke;"|Abitibi-Ouest
|
|Martin Veilleux
|
|Sylvain Vachon
||
|Suzanne Blais
|
|Rose Marquis
|
|Yan Dominic Couture
|
|Eric Lacroix
|
|Stéphane Lévesque
|
|Maxim Sylvestre (Ind.)
||
|François Gendron ‡
|-
| style="background:whitesmoke;"|Rouyn-Noranda–Témiscamingue
|
|Luc Blanchette
|
|Gilles Chapadeau
|
|Jérémy G. Bélanger
||
|Émilise Lessard-Therrien
|
|Jessica Wells
|
|Guillaume Lanouette
|
|Fernand St-Georges
|
|
||
|Luc Blanchette

|}

|-
| style="background:whitesmoke;"|Chapleau
|
|Marc Carrière
|
|Blake Ippersiel
||
|Mathieu Lévesque
|
|Alexandre Albert
|
|
|
|Rowen Tanguay
|
|Françoise Roy
|
|
||
|Marc Carrière
|-
| style="background:whitesmoke;"|Gatineau
|
|Luce Farrell
|
|Jonathan Carreiro-Benoit
||
|Robert Bussière
|
|Milan Bernard
|
|Jasper Boychuk
|
|Mario Belec
|
|Alexandre Deschênes
|
|
||
|Stéphanie Vallée ‡
|-
| style="background:whitesmoke;"|Hull
||
|Maryse Gaudreault
|
|Marysa Nadeau
|
|Rachel Bourdon
|
|Benoit Renaud
|
|Patricia Pilon
|
|Jean-Philippe Chaussé
|
|Pierre Soublière
|
|Marco Jetté (CAP)Nichola St-Jean (NDP)
||
|Maryse Gaudreault
|-
| style="background:whitesmoke;"|Papineau
|
|Alexandre Iracà
|
|Yves Destroismaisons
||
|Mathieu Lacombe
|
|Mélanie Pilon-Gauvin
|
|Michel Tardif
|
|Joanne Godin
|
|
|
|Lynn Boyer (CAP)Claude Flaus (P51)Isabelle Yde (Nul)
||
|Alexandre Iracà
|-
| style="background:whitesmoke;"|Pontiac
||
|André Fortin
|
|Marie-Claire Nivolon
|
|Olive Kamanyana
|
|Julia Wilkie
|
|Roger Fleury
|
|Kenny Roy
|
|Louis Lang
|
|Samuel Gendron (NDP)
||
|André Fortin
|}

Chaudière-Appalaches

|-
| style="background:whitesmoke;"|Beauce-Nord
|
|Myriam Taschereau
|
|Daniel Perron
||
|Luc Provençal
|
|Fernand Dorval
|
|
|
|Isabelle Villeneuve
|
|Nicole Goulet
|
|
||
|André Spénard ‡
|-
| style="background:whitesmoke;"|Beauce-Sud
|
|Paul Busque
|
|Guillaume Grondin
||
|Samuel Poulin
|
|Diane Vincent
|
|Cassandre Poulin
|
|Milan Jovanovic
|
|Jean Paquet
|
|Hans Mercier (P51)
||
|Paul Busque
|-
| style="background:whitesmoke;"|Bellechasse
|
|Dominique Vien
|
|Benoît Béchard
||
|Stéphanie Lachance
|
|Benoit Comeau
|
|
|
|Dominique Messner
|
|
|
|Simon Guay (BP)Sébastien Roy (Prov.)
||
|Dominique Vien
|-
| style="background:whitesmoke;"|Chutes-de-la-Chaudière
|
|Ghyslain Vaillancourt
|
|Serge Bonin
||
|Marc Picard
|
|Olivier Bolduc
|
|
|
|Philippe Gaboury
|
|Stéphane Blais
|
|Evelyne Henry (NDP)
||
|Marc Picard
|-
| style="background:whitesmoke;"|Lévis
|
|Abdulkadir Abkey
|
|Pierre-Gilles Morel
||
|François Paradis
|
|Georges Goma
|
|Maude Bussière
|
|Michel Walters
|
|Nancy Fournier
|
|Lorraine Chartier (NDP)Stéphane L'heureux-Blouin (BP)
||
|François Paradis
|-
| style="background:whitesmoke;"|Lotbinière-Frontenac
|
|Pierre-Luc Daigle
|
|Yohann Beaulieu
||
|Isabelle Lecours
|
|Normand Beaudet
|
|Marie-Claude Dextraze
|
|Réjean Labbé
|
|Yves Roy
|
|Daniel Croteau (P51)
||
|Laurent Lessard ‡
|}

Centre-du-Québec

|-
| style="background:whitesmoke;"|Arthabaska
|
|Pierre Poirier
|
|Jacques Daigle
||
|Éric Lefebvre
|
|William Champigny-Fortier
|
|Jean-Charles Pelland
|
|Lisette Guay Gaudreault
|
|
|
|Jean Landry (Prov.)
||
|Éric Lefebvre
|-

|-
| style="background:whitesmoke;"|Drummond–Bois-Francs
|
|Kevin Deland
|
|Diane Roy
||
|Sébastien Schneeberger
|
|Lannïck Dinard
|
|
|
|François Picard
|
|
|
|Sylvain Marcoux (Ind.)Steve Therion (Auto.)
||
|Sébastien Schneeberger
|-
| style="background:whitesmoke;"|Johnson
|
|François Vaes
|
|Jacques Tétreault
||
|André Lamontagne
|
|Sarah Saint-Cyr Lanoie
|
|Émile Coderre
|
|Jean-François Vignola
|
|Yves Audet
|
|Andrew Leblanc-Marcil (NDP)
||
|André Lamontagne
|-
| style="background:whitesmoke;"|Nicolet-Bécancour
|
|Marie-Claude Durand
|
|Lucie Allard
||
|Donald Martel
|
|François Poisson
|
|Vincent Marcotte
|
|Jessie Mc Nicoll
|
|
|
|Blak D. Blackburn (BP)
||
|Donald Martel
|}

Laval

|-
| style="background:whitesmoke;"|Chomedey
||
|Guy Ouellette
|
|Ouerdia Nacera Beddad
|
|Alice Abou-Khalil
|
|Rabah Moulla
|
|Fatine Kabbaj
|
|Nick Keramarios
|
|Omar El-Harrache
|
|
||
|Guy Ouellette
|-
| style="background:whitesmoke;"|Fabre
||
|Monique Sauvé
|
|Odette Lavigne
|
|Adriana Dudas
|
|Nora Yata
|
|David Gilbert-Parisée
|
|Juliett Zuniga Lopez
|
|Karim Mahmoodi
|
|
||
|Monique Sauvé
|-
| style="background:whitesmoke;"|Laval-des-Rapides
||
|Saul Polo
|
|Jocelyn Caron
|
|Christine Mitton
|
|Graciela Mateo
|
|Estelle Obeo
|
|Benoit Larocque
|
|Jean Phariste Pharicien
|
|Bianca Bozsodi (CAP)Elias Progakis (PL)
||
|Saul Polo
|-
| style="background:whitesmoke;"|Mille-Îles
||
|Francine Charbonneau
|
|Michel Lachance
|
|Mauro Barone
|
|Jean Trudelle
|
|Alain Joseph
|
|
|
|
|
|Dwayne Cappelletti (PL)Jason D'Aoust (BP)
||
|Francine Charbonneau
|-
| style="background:whitesmoke;"|Sainte-Rose
|
|Jean Habel
|
|Marc-André Constantin
||
|Christopher Skeete
|
|Simon Charron
|
|Caroline Bergevin
|
|Benoit Blanchard
|
|Alain Giguère
|
|Valérie Louis-Charles (CINQ)
||
|Jean Habel
|-
| style="background:whitesmoke;"|Vimont
||
|Jean Rousselle
|
|Sylvie Moreau
|
|Michel Reeves
|
|Caroline Trottier-Gascon
|
|Mélanie Messier
|
|Rachel Landerman
|
|Andriana Kocini
|
|Jean-Marc Boyer (Ind.)Rachel Demers (CAP)
||
|Jean Rousselle
|}

Lanaudière

|-
| style="background:whitesmoke;"|Berthier
|
|Robert Magnan
|
|André Villeneuve
||
|Caroline Proulx
|
|Louise Beaudry
|
|Jérôme St-Jean
|
|
|
|Rémi Bourdon
||
|André Villeneuve
|-
| style="background:whitesmoke;"|Joliette
|
|Emilie Imbeault
||
|Véronique Hivon
|
|François St-Louis
|
|Judith Sicard
|
|Étienne St-Jean
|
|
|
|Sébastien Dupuis
||
|Véronique Hivon
|-
| style="background:whitesmoke;"|L'Assomption
|
|Virginie Bouchard
|
|Sylvie Langlois Brouillette
||
|François Legault
|
|Marie-Claude Brière
|
|Eve Bellavance
|
|Charles-Etienne Everitt-Raynault
|
|Sylvie Tougas
||
|François Legault
|-
| style="background:whitesmoke;"|Masson
|
|Maryanne Beauchamp
|
|Diane Gadoury Hamelin
||
|Mathieu Lemay
|
|Stéphane Durupt
|
|Véronique Dubois
|
|David Morin
|
|
||
|Mathieu Lemay
|-
| style="background:whitesmoke;"|Repentigny
|
|Emilie Therrien
|
|Eric Tremblay
||
|Lise Lavallée
|
|Olivier Huard
|
|Chafika Hebib
|
|Pierre Lacombe
|
|Julie Girard
||
|Lise Lavallée
|-
| style="background:whitesmoke;"|Rousseau
|
|Patrick Watson
|
|Nicolas Marceau
||
|Louis-Charles Thouin
|
|Hélène Dubé
|
|
|
|Richard Evanko
|
|Michel Lacasse
||
|Nicolas Marceau
|-
| style="background:whitesmoke;"|Terrebonne
|
|Margaux Selam
|
|Mathieu Traversy
||
|Pierre Fitzgibbon
|
|Anne B-Godbout
|
|Carole Dubois
|
|Jules Néron
|
|Mathieu Goyette
||
|Mathieu Traversy
|}

Laurentides

|-
| style="background:whitesmoke;"|Argenteuil
|
|Bernard Bigras-Denis
|
|Patrick Côté
||
|Agnès Grondin
|
|Céline Lachapelle
|
|Carole Thériault
|
|Sherwin Edwards
|
|Louise Wiseman
|
|Stéphanie Boyer (PL)Yves St-Denis (Ind.)
||
|Yves St-Denis
|-
| style="background:whitesmoke;"|Bertrand
|
|Diane de Passillé
|
|Gilbert Lafrenière
||
|Nadine Girault
|
|Mylène Jaccoud
|
|Natacha Alarie
|
|Kathy Laframboise
|
|Benoît Pigeon
|
|Benoit Martin (PL)
||
|Claude Cousineau ‡
|-
| style="background:whitesmoke;"|Blainville
|
|Lucia Carvalho
|
|Gabriel Gousse
||
|Mario Laframboise
|
|William Lepage
|
|Valérie Fortier
|
|
|
|Jean Bastien
|
|Thierry Gervais (NDP)
||
|Mario Laframboise
|-
| style="background:whitesmoke;"|Deux-Montagnes
|
|Fabienne Fatou Diop
|
|Daniel Goyer
||
|Benoit Charette
|
|Audrey Lesage-Lanthier
|
|Isabelle Dagenais
|
|Delia Fodor
|
|Denis Paré
|
|Martin Brulé (PL)Eric Emond (CINQ)Hans Roker Jr (BP)
||
|Benoit Charette
|-
| style="background:whitesmoke;"|Groulx
|
|Sabrina Chartrand
|
|Jean-Philippe Meloche
||
|Eric Girard
|
|Fabien Torres
|
|Robin Dick
|
|Vincent Aubé
|
|Chantal Lavoie
|
|Claude Surprenant (Ind.)
||
|Claude Surprenant
|-
| style="background:whitesmoke;"|Labelle
|
|Nadine Riopel
|
|Sylvain Pagé
||
|Chantale Jeannotte
|
|Gabriel Dagenais
|
|René Fournier
|
|Francis Brosseau
|
|Régis Ostigny
|
|
||
|Sylvain Pagé
|-
| style="background:whitesmoke;"|Les Plaines
|
|Vincent Orellana-Pepin
|
|Marc-Olivier Leblanc
||
|Lucie Lecours
|
|Kévin St-Jean
|
|Boris Geynet
|
|Mathieu Laliberté
|
|
|
|Mathieu Stevens (PL)
|
| New district
|-
| style="background:whitesmoke;"|Mirabel
|
|Camille Arsenault Brideau
|
|Denise Beaudoin
||
|Sylvie D'Amours
|
|Marjolaine Goudreau
|
|Émilie Paiement
|
|Désiré Mounanga
|
|
|
|Vincent Laurin (BP)Patricia Vaca (CINQ)
||
|Sylvie D'Amours
|-
| style="background:whitesmoke;"|Prévost
|
|Naömie Goyette
|
|Paul St-Pierre Plamondon
||
|Marguerite Blais
|
|Lucie Mayer
|
|
|
|Malcolm Mulcahy
|
|
|
|Michel Leclerc (PL)
|
| New district
|-
| style="background:whitesmoke;"|Saint-Jérôme
|
|Antoine Poulin
|
|Marc Bourcier
||
|Youri Chassin
|
|Ève Duhaime
|
|Annabelle Desrochers
|
|Normand Michaud
|
|Sylvie Brien
|
|Christine Simon (NDP)Giuseppe Starnino (PL)
||
|Marc Bourcier
|}

Montérégie

Eastern

|-
| style="background:whitesmoke;"|Borduas
|
|Martin Nichols
|
|Cédric G.-Ducharme
||
|Simon Jolin-Barrette
|
|Annie Desharnais
|
|Nicolas Gravel
|
|André Lecompte
|
|André Martin
|
|Razz E. (BP)Stéphane Thévenot (CAP)
||
|Simon Jolin-Barrette
|-
| style="background:whitesmoke;"|Brome-Missisquoi
|
|Ingrid Marini
|
|Andréanne Larouche
||
|Isabelle Charest
|
|Alexandre Legault
|
|Elisabeth Dionne
|
|
|
|
|
|Marc Alarie (VP)Manon Gamache (CAP)
||
|Pierre Paradis ‡
|-
| style="background:whitesmoke;"|Chambly
|
|François Villeneuve
|
|Christian Picard
||
|Jean-François Roberge
|
|Francis Vigeant
|
|Camille B. Jannard
|
|Guy L'Heureux
|
|Gilles Létourneau
|
|Gilles Guindon (CINQ)Benjamin Vachon (BP)
||
|Jean-François Roberge
|-
| style="background:whitesmoke;"|Granby
|
|Lyne Laverdure
|
|Chantal Beauchemin
||
|François Bonnardel
|
|Anne-Sophie Legault
|
|Daphné Poulin
|
|Pierre Bélanger
|
|
|
|Stéphane Deschamps (Nul)Kevin Robidas (BP)
||
|François Bonnardel
|-
| style="background:whitesmoke;"|Iberville
|
|Mylène Gaudreau
|
|Nicolas Dionne
||
|Claire Samson
|
|Philippe Jetten-Vigeant
|
|Michelle Kolatschek
|
|Serge Benoit
|
|Marc-André Renaud
|
|Dany Desjardins (BP)
||
|Claire Samson
|-
| style="background:whitesmoke;"|Richelieu
|
|Sophie Chevalier
|
|Sylvain Rochon
||
|Jean-Bernard Émond
|
|Sophie Pagé-Sabourin
|
|Ksenia Svetoushkina
|
|Patrick Corriveau
|
|
|
|
||
|Sylvain Rochon
|-
| style="background:whitesmoke;"|Saint-Hyacinthe
|
|Annie Pelletier
|
|Daniel Breton
||
|Chantal Soucy
|
|Marijo Demers
|
|
|
|
|
|Luc Chulak
|
|
||
|Chantal Soucy
|-
| style="background:whitesmoke;"|Saint-Jean
|
|Vanessa Parent
|
|Dave Turcotte
||
|Louis Lemieux
|
|Simon Lalonde
|
|Véronique Langlois
|
|Philippe Perreault
|
|Geneviève Ruel
|
|Louis Saint-Jacques (CAP)
||
|Dave Turcotte
|-
| style="background:whitesmoke;"|Verchères
|
|Agnieszka Wnorowska
|
|Stéphane Bergeron
||
|Suzanne Dansereau
|
|Jean-René Péloquin
|
|Pierre-Olivier Downey
|
|Lisette Benoit
|
|Vincent Hillel
|
|
||
|Stéphane Bergeron
|}

South Shore

|-
| style="background:whitesmoke;"|Beauharnois
|
|Félix Rhéaume
|
|Mireille Théorêt
||
|Claude Reid
|
|Pierre-Paul St-Onge
|
|
|
|Yannick Campeau
|
|François Mantion
|
|Tommy Mathieu (CAP)
||
|Guy Leclair ‡
|-
| style="background:whitesmoke;"|Châteauguay
|
|Pierre Moreau
|
|Jean-Philippe Thériault
||
|MarieChantal Chassé
|
|Sandrine Garcia-McDiarmid
|
|Stephanie Stevenson
|
|Jeff Benoit
|
|Marie-Ève Masucci-Lauzon
|
|
||
|Pierre Moreau
|-
| style="background:whitesmoke;"|Huntingdon
|
|Stéphane Billette
|
|Huguette Hébert
||
|Claire IsaBelle
|
|Aiden Hodgins-Ravensbergen
|
|Victoria Mary Haliburton
|
|Jérémie Ouellette
|
|Charles Orme
|
|
||
|Stéphane Billette
|-
| style="background:whitesmoke;"|La Pinière
||
|Gaétan Barrette
|
|Suzanne Gagnon
|
|Sylvia Baronian
|
|Marie Pagès
|
|Aziza Dini
|
|Anwar El Youbi
|
|Djaouida Sellah
|
|Patrick Hayes (Ind.)Fang Hu (Ind.)
||
|Gaétan Barrette
|-
| style="background:whitesmoke;"|Laporte
||
|Nicole Ménard
|
|Annie Lessard
|
|Jacinthe-Eve Arel
|
|Claude Lefrançois
|
|Sabrina Huet-Côté
|
|Linda Therrien
|
|Marc André Audet
|
|
||
|Nicole Ménard
|-
| style="background:whitesmoke;"|La Prairie
|
|Richard Merlini
|
|Cathy Lepage
||
|Christian Dubé
|
|Daniel Blouin
|
|Alexandre Caron
|
|Alain Desmarais
|
|Boukare Tall
|
|Normand Chouinard (ML)Liana Minato (P51) 
||
|Richard Merlini
|-
| style="background:whitesmoke;"|Marie-Victorin
|
|Sonia Ziadé
||
|Catherine Fournier
|
|Martyne Prévost
|
|Carl Lévesque
|
|Laeticia Poiré-Hill
|
|
|
|Myriam de Grandpré-Ruel
|
|Shirley Cedent (CINQ)Pierre Chénier (ML)Florent Portron (Auto.)
||
|Catherine Fournier
|-
| style="background:whitesmoke;"|Montarville
|
|Ludovic Grisé Farand
|
|Daniel Michelin
||
|Nathalie Roy
|
|Caroline Charette
|
|
|
|
|
|Lise Roy
|
|Jean Dury (BP)
||
|Nathalie Roy
|-
| style="background:whitesmoke;"|Sanguinet
|
|Marcelina Jugureanu
|
|Alain Therrien
||
|Danielle McCann
|
|Maya Fréchette-Bonnier
|
|Antonino Geraci
|
|Nikolai Grigoriev
|
|
|
|Hélène Héroux (ML)
||
|Alain Therrien
|-
| style="background:whitesmoke;"|Soulanges
|
|Lucie Charlebois
|
|Samuelle Ducrocq-Henry
||
|Marilyne Picard
|
|Maxime Larue-Bourdages
|
|Bianca Jitaru
|
|Felice Trombino
|
|Etienne Madelein
|
|Jean-Patrick Berthiaume (BP)Patrick Marquis (Auto.)Dominik Prud'homme (CAP)
||
|Lucie Charlebois
|-
| style="background:whitesmoke;"|Taillon
|
|Mohammed Barhone
|
|Diane Lamarre
||
|Lionel Carmant
|
|Manon Blanchard
|
|Mel-Lyna Cadieux Walker
|
|Gerardin Verty
|
|Jonathan Leduc
|
|
||
|Diane Lamarre
|-
| style="background:whitesmoke;"|Vachon
|
|Linda Caron
|
|Patrick Ney
||
|Ian Lafrenière
|
|André Vincent
|
|
|
|Lise des Greniers
|
|Ian Lecourtois
|
|Hugo Bluntss (BP)Stéphane Marginean (CAP)
||
|Martine Ouellet ‡
|-
| style="background:whitesmoke;"|Vaudreuil
||
|Marie-Claude Nichols
|
|Philip Lapalme
|
|Claude Bourbonnais
|
|Igor Erchov
|
|Jason Mossa
|
|Ryan Robertson
|
|Ryan Young
|
|Camille Piché-Jetté (BP)Daniel Pilon (CAP)
||
|Marie-Claude Nichols
|}

Results
The CAQ went into the election as the third party in the legislature, but won a decisive victory with 74 seats, exceeding all published opinion polling. The Liberals won 31 seats, while Québec solidaire and the Parti Québécois each won 10 seats. This is the second election in a row in which a government has been defeated after only one term.

The CAQ formed government for the first time, mainly by dominating its traditional heartlands of Capitale-Nationale, Chaudière-Appalaches and Centre-du-Québec, while winning sweeps or near-sweeps in Mauricie, Estrie, Lanaudière, Montérégie, the Laurentides and northern Quebec. Many of their gains came at the expense of the PQ. The CAQ took a number of seats that had been in PQ hands for four decades or more, in some cases by landslide margins. It did, however, win only two seats in Montreal.

The Parti Québécois came up two seats short of official status in the legislature. Notably, it was completely shut out in Montreal for the first time in decades; indeed, it won only one seat (Marie-Victorin in Longueuil) in the entire Greater Montreal area. It was easily the PQ's worst showing in a provincial election in 45 years. For the second election in a row, its leader was unseated in his own riding. According to a postmortem by The Globe and Mail, the PQ was so decisively beaten that there were already questions about whether it could survive. Echoing this, Christian Bourque of Montreal-based pollster Léger Marketing told The Guardian that he believed the PQ was likely finished in its present form, and would have to merge with another sovereigntist party to avoid fading into irrelevance.

The election was viewed as the Liberals' worst defeat since the 1976 election. While the party more than held its own in Montreal (where it won 19 out of 27 seats) and Laval (where it retained all but one seat), it only won seven seats elsewhere.

This was the first election in which Québec Solidaire won seats outside Montreal, taking one seat from the PQ and three from the Liberals.

The CAQ won 37.4 percent of the popular vote, a smaller vote share than the Liberals' 41 percent in 2014 and the lowest vote share on record for a party winning a majority government. However, due to the nature of the first-past-the-post system, which awards power solely on the basis of seats won, the CAQ's heavy concentration of support in the regions they dominated was enough for a strong majority of 11 seats. Quebec elections have historically seen large disparities between the raw vote and the actual seat count.

Following the elections, both Jean-François Lisée and Philippe Couillard resigned.  

|-
! colspan=2 rowspan=2 | Political party
! rowspan=2 | Party leader
! colspan=5 | MNAs
! colspan=4 | Votes
|-
! Candidates
!2014
!Dissol.
!2018
!±
!#
!±
!%
! ± (pp)

| style="text-align:left;" | François Legault
| 125
| 22
| 21
| 74
| 53
| 1,509,455
| 533,848
| 37.42
| 14.37

| style="text-align:left;" | Philippe Couillard
| 125
| 70
| 68
| 31
| 37
| 1,001,037
| 756,034
| 24.82
| 16.70

| style="text-align:left;" | Jean-François Lisée
| 125
| 30
| 28
| 10
| 18
| 687,995
| 386,125
| 17.06
| 8.32

| style="text-align:left;" | Manon Massé, Gabriel Nadeau-Dubois
| 125
| 3
| 3
| 10
| 7
| 649,503
| 326,379
| 16.10
| 8.47

| colspan="2" style="text-align:left;" | Independent
| 21
| –
| 5
| –
| 5
| 6,462
| 8,899
| 0.16
| 0.20

| style="text-align:left;" | Alex Tyrrell
| 97
| –
| –
| –
| –
| 67,870
| 44,707
| 1.68
| 1.13

| style="text-align:left;" | Adrien Pouliot
| 101
| –
| –
| –
| –
| 59,055
| 42,626
| 1.46
| 1.07

| style="text-align:left;" | Raphaël Fortin
| 59
| –
| –
| –
| –
| 22,863
| 
| 0.57
| 
|-
| bgcolor="#003399" | 
| style="text-align:left;" |Citoyens au pouvoir du Québec
| style="text-align:left;" | Stéphane Blais (intérim)
| 56
| –
| –
| –
| –
| 13,768
| 12,477
| 0.34
| 0.31

| style="text-align:left;" | Jean-Patrick Berthiaume
| 29
| –
| –
| –
| –
| 4,657
| 1,967
| 0.12
| 0.06

| style="text-align:left;" | Renaud Blais
| 16
| –
| –
| –
| –
| 3,659
| 3,880
| 0.09
| 0.03

| style="text-align:left;" | Pierre Chénier
| 25
| –
| –
| –
| –
| 1,708
| 308
| 0.04
| 0.01

| style="text-align:left;" | Michel Leclerc
| 8
| –
| –
| –
| –
| 1,678
| 
| 0.04
| 

| style="text-align:left;" | Stéphane Pouleur
| 12
| –
| –
| –
| –
| 1,138
| 738
| 0.03
| 0.02

| style="text-align:left;" | Hans Mercier
| 5
| –
| –
| –
| –
| 1,117
| 
| 0.03
| 
|-
| bgcolor="#6C0277" | 
| style="text-align:left;" |Changement intégrité pour notre Québec
| style="text-align:left;" | Eric Emond
| 7
| –
| –
| –
| –
| 693
| 
| 0.02
| 

| style="text-align:left;" | Sébastien Roy
| 2
| –
| –
| –
| –
| 521
| 
| 0.01
| 

| style="text-align:left;" | Marc Alarie
| 1
| –
| –
| –
| –
| 190
| 
| –
| 

| style="text-align:left;" | Jean-Louis Thémistocle
| 1
| –
| –
| –
| –
| 169
| 
| –
| 

| colspan="6" style="text-align:left;" | n/a
| colspan="3" |Merged with QS
| 0.73

| style="text-align:left;" | Patricia Domingos
| –
| –
| –
| –
| –
| colspan="3" |did not campaign
| 0.04

| colspan="6" style="text-align:left;" | n/a
| colspan="3" |Party dissolved
| 0.01

| colspan="6" style="text-align:left;" | n/a
| colspan="3" |Party dissolved
| 0.01

| colspan="6" style="text-align:left;" | n/a 
| colspan="3" |Party dissolved
| –

| colspan="6" style="text-align:left;" | n/a
| colspan="3" |Party dissolved
| –

| colspan="6" style="text-align:left;" | n/a
| colspan="3" |Party dissolved
| –
|- style="background-color:#e9e9e9;"
| colspan="3" style="text-align:left;" | Total
| 940
| 125
| 125
| 125
| 
| 4,033,538
| 198,724
| colspan="2"|
|-
| colspan="8" style="text-align:left;" | Rejected ballots
| 66,085
| 3,292
| colspan="2"|
|-
| colspan="8" style="text-align:left;" | Voter turnout
| 4,099,623
| 195,432
| 66.45%
| 4.99
|-
| colspan="8" style="text-align:left;" | Registered electors
| 6,169,772
| 157,282
| colspan="2"|
|}

Summary analysis

Synopsis of riding results

See also
 41st Quebec Legislature
 Politics of Quebec
 Timeline of Quebec history
 List of political parties in Quebec

Notes

References

Further reading

External links

Web site of Quebec's Chief Electoral Officer

Elections in Quebec
Quebec general election
Quebec general election